Whitehorn or Whitehorne is a surname. Notable people with the name include:

Geoff Whitehorn (born 1951), British singer-songwriter
George Whitehorne (died 1565), Canon of Windsor 
Jason Whitehorn (born 1976), American singer-songwriter
John Clare Whitehorn (1894–1974), American psychiatric educator 
Joseph A. Whitehorn (1879–1926), American politician
Katharine Whitehorn (1928–2021), British journalist
Laura Whitehorn (born 1945), American activist
Will Whitehorn (born 1960), British business executive